Canim Lake can refer to:

Canim Lake (British Columbia), a lake in British Columbia, Canada
Canim Lake, British Columbia, a settlement in British Columbia, Canada
Canim Lake Band, a First Nation in British Columbia, Canada

See also
Canim Falls
Canim River
Canim Beach Provincial Park